Thomas O. Melia (born 28 May 1957 in Frankfurt, Germany) currently serves as Washington director at PEN America. Previously, he served in the Obama Administration as USAID's assistant administrator for Europe and Eurasia (2015–2017) and as Deputy Assistant Secretary of State in the Bureau of Democracy, Human Rights and Labor, at the United States Department of State (2010–2015). Melia previously served as executive director of Democracy International, an organization that designs, implements, and evaluates democracy and governance programs around the world. Melia also served as the deputy executive director of Freedom House, a human rights organization.

Education
Melia earned a BA from Johns Hopkins University in International Relations and an MA with a concentration in Africa Studies from the Johns Hopkins University School of Advanced International Studies in 1979. While in graduate school, Melia worked as an intern at the National Security Council at the White House, on Africa issues. During the summer of 1978, he worked at the U.S. embassy in Nouakchott, Mauritania.

Professional career
Melia began his career as a research assistant to U.S. Senator Daniel Patrick Moynihan in 1980 and eventually became Senior Legislative Assistant for foreign and defense policy. He left in 1986 to become associate director of the Free Trade Union Institute of the AFL-CIO (now the Solidarity Center).

Melia served as NDI's Vice President for Programs from 1998 to 2001, designing and overseeing programs in Africa, Central and Eastern Europe, the Near East, and South Asia. From 1988 to 1993, he directed the Central and Eastern Europe Programs, bringing the institute to the region before the fall of the Berlin Wall. From 1993 to 1996, he directed NDI's Middle East Programs and the Institute's Democratic Governance program.

From 1999 to 2000, Melia was an adjunct professor at the Edmund A. Walsh School of Foreign Service, where he taught graduate courses about democracy promotion. He was a senior associate at Greenberg Quinlan Rosner Research, Inc. from 2001 to 2002 and research associate and director of research at the Institute for the Study of Diplomacy at Georgetown University from 2002 to 2005. He taught graduate-level courses at Georgetown's Department of Democracy and Governance Studies and in the International Development program at Johns Hopkins University's School for Advanced International Studies.

He supervised research projects conducted by diplomats and military officers from the U.S. and abroad. At Georgetown, he was the principal investigator for reports on Congressional attitudes toward the State Department and terrorism's impact on diplomacy; he directed the first public opinion research conducted in post-Taliban Afghanistan in 2002 and in post-Saddam Hussein Iraq in 2003.

From 2005 to 2010, Melia was deputy executive director of Freedom House. He testified before the United States Congress, advised the Swedish government, and in 2008 testified before two committees in the National Assembly of Hungary. He co-edited a report on rights and freedoms in the U.S. entitled Today’s American: How Free and he was the principal author of the Freedom House guide to assisting human rights defenders.

Foreign policy expertise
Melia is a regular contributor to the American Interest, publishing on current challenges to democracy globally. According to author Eric Bjornlund, Melia coined the phrase “democracy bureaucracy” in the mid-1990s to describe the proliferating community of agencies and NGOs inside and outside government involved in democracy promotion efforts. Melia subsequently published “The Democracy Bureaucracy” in the American Interest in 2006.

News outlets such as CNN, The New York Times and The Washington Post interview Melia on democratic issues, including President Barack Obama's policy toward Russia and the global downturn in political freedom.

Bibliography

Select publications, remarks, and research
 Interview with Deputy Assistant Secretary Melia with Magyar Nemzet Newspaper: "Hungarian Democracy is an American Interest," 5 June 2012.
 Remarks, Thomas O. Melia, Deputy Assistant Secretary, “2012: A Decision Year for Ukraine,” US Embassy, Kyiv, 16 March 2012
 Testimony of Thomas O. Melia, Deputy Assistant Secretary of State for Democracy, Human Rights and Labor Before the U.S. Senate Foreign Relations Committee “U.S. Policy on Supporting Human Rights and the Rule of Law in Russia” 14 December 2011
 Testimony of Deputy Assistant Secretary Thomas O. Melia, House Foreign Affairs Europe and Eurasia Subcommittee, “Eastern Europe: The State of Democracy and Freedom,” 26 July 2011
 Deputy Assistant Secretary Remarks in Minsk, Belarus, on 24 January 2011 as covered by the Telegraf.
 Deputy Assistant Secretary Remarks at the OSCE Session on Fundamental Freedoms, Distributed by the Bureau of International Information Programs, U.S. Department of State, available here.
 Testimony of Thomas O. Melia, Deputy Assistant Secretary of State for Democracy, Human Rights and Labor Before the Subcommittee on European Affairs, Senate Foreign Relations Committee, "Crackdown in Belarus: Responding to the Lukashenka Regime," 27 January 2010.
 Melia, Thomas O. “Supporting Democracy Abroad: Transatlantic Cooperation at the Crossroads,” in Shoulder to Shoulder: Forging a Strategic US EU Partnership, Edited by Hamilton, Daniel S. (The Paul H. Nitze School for Advanced International Studies, Johns Hopkins Center for Transatlantic Relations, 2010) 293 – 303.
 Melia, Thomas O. “Back to the Future of Human Rights: Mobilize the democratic faction” Remarks Prepared for Delivery at a Symposium organized by the Democracy and Governance Program, Georgetown University. “Globalizing Autocracy, US Foreign Policy and Democracy Assistance,” National Press Club, Washington, D.C., 10 December 2008.
 Melia, Thomas O. “The Democracy Bureaucracy: The Infrastructure of the American Democracy Promotion” A discussion paper prepared for the Princeton Project on National Security Working Group on Global Institutions and Foreign Policy Infrastructure, 2006.
 Melia, Thomas O. (Winter/Spring 2003) “What Muslims Want: In Afghanistan, and Elsewhere—Democracy,” Georgetown Journal of International Affairs IV (1): 155–162.
 Melia, Thomas O. Congressional Staff Attitudes Toward the Department of State and Foreign Service Officers. A report based on 25 One-on-One Interviews With Key Congressional Staff. Prepared for the Una Chapman Cox Foundation, Institute for the Study of Diplomacy, Georgetown University, October 2002.

Book reviews
 Melia, Thomas O. “What Makes Legislatures Strong?” Review of The Handbook of National Legislatures: A Global Survey by M. Steven Fish and Matthew Kroenig, and Legislative Power in Emerging African Democracies edited by Joel D. Barkan. Journal of Democracy, April 2010, Volume 21, Number 2.
 Melia, Thomas O. "Ousting the "Final 45" Review of Breaking the Real Axis of Evil: How to Oust the World's Dictators by 2025 By Mark Palmer (Rowman & Littlefield 2003) Journal of Democracy, 15.2 (2004): 170-173.
 Melia, Thomas O. "Serious Thinking About Democratization." A Review of Democratic Institution Performance; Research and Policty Perspectives Edward R. McMahon and Thomas A.P. Sinclair, editors, Georgetown Journal of International Affairs, 5.1 (2004): 131-137.
 Melia, Thomas O. "Measuring Democratic Commitment." A Review of Defending Democracy: A Global Survey of Foreign Policy Trends 1992-2002. By Robert G. Herman and Theodore J. Piccone, eds. Democracy Coalition Project, 2002. Journal of Democracy 14.3 (2003): 171-174.

Opinions
 “Middle Eastern Freedom Lags as Washington Turns Away” Daily Star (Beirut), 8 February 2007
 (Co-Authored with Jennifer Windsor) ""U.S. Must Continue to do the right thing"." Daily Star (Beirut), 9 July 2004
 (Co-Authored with Brian Katulis) "To Win Over Iraqis." Washington Post 10 August 2003

Awards and board affiliations
 Eagle Scout, Vigil Honor (Order of the Arrow)
 Board of Directors, Project on Middle East Democracy (POMED)

References

External links

1957 births
Living people
Paul H. Nitze School of Advanced International Studies alumni
United States Assistant Secretaries of State